Imexon (INN, trade name Amplimexon) is a substance that is being studied in the treatment of some types of cancer, including pancreatic, lung, breast, prostate, melanoma, and multiple myeloma. It is a cyanoaziridine derivative.

References 
 Amplimexon entry in the public domain NCI Dictionary of Cancer Terms

Experimental cancer drugs